Farah Zeb Khalid also known as Farah X, is a Pakistani American director and editor. She is known for her work on the documentary film The Remix: Hip Hop X Fashion.

Life and career
Farah was born in Nashville, Tennessee and grew up in Los Angeles, California. In 1995, she modeled in London and Paris before returning to Los Angeles to attend the USC School of Cinematic Arts undergraduate program. In 2005, she  joined Sunset Edit as their only female editor. She has worked with singers such as Prince, Mariah Carey, Beyoncé and Rapsody. In 2006, she directed a segment for the feature documentary Dropped.  In 2015, Farah directed a piece for Mariah Carey’s Infinity.

In 2019, Farah directed a music video for Rapsody's Oprah, featuring Leikeli47 and Reyna Biddy, which won Best Music Video at the Urbanworld Film Festival in 2020. Farah co-directed The Remix: Hip Hop X Fashion, along with Lisa Cortes, which premiered at the Tribeca Film Festival. It also won six Best Documentary awards including at the Sidewalk Film Festival and Milwaukee Film Festival.

In 2021, Farah directed a five episode online series, SeeHer: Multiplicity, which won a Gracie award for Original Programming in 2022. The series also won 2022 gold and silver Telly awards.

Filmography

References

External links
 
 

1976 births
Living people
American documentary filmmakers
American film editors
American women film editors
People from Nashville, Tennessee
Film people from Los Angeles
21st-century American women